Hayatabad Sports Complex is a sports academy located in Hayatabad, Peshawar, the capital of Khyber Pakhtunkhwa province in Pakistan. It was formally inaugurated after renovation by PTI chairman Imran Khan in October 2016. It is owned by the Government of Khyber Pakhtunkhwa.

History & Development 
Hayatabad Sports Complex, Peshawar was originally constructed in early 1990s and had sporting facilities for all major sports. However, in the late 1990s, the sports facility was turned into commercial hub, private party arena, along with a marriage hall. Renovation work was started in June 2013 and completed in October 2016, at a cost of Rs.210 million. It was then formally inaugurated after renovation by PTI Chairman Imran Khan. It currently covers an area of 150 Kanals (5399.56 sq-feet). 

Hayatabad Cricket Stadium in Peshawar with a crowd capacity of over 10,000 spectators is all set to host national and international matches in upcoming months. Upgradation of the stadium has completed by National Logistics Cell (NLC) under the supervision of NESPAK and Khyber Pakhtunkhwa Sport Directorate. The stadium has been completed by the National Logistics Cell (NLC) in two years and cutting-edge facilities have been provided including the main pavilion, general stands, Pakistan’s largest digital scoreboard, media boxes for both print and electronic media, firefighting, HVAC systems, security and extra-low voltage (ELV) systems, and other allied amenities etc.

Sporting Facilities 
Hayatabad Sports Complex currently contains sporting facilities for the following sports.
 Football
 Field Hockey
 Cricket 
 Swimming
 Squash
 Board Games
 Table Tennis
Badminton 
Tennis
Gymnasium
 Basketball

See also
 List of stadiums in Pakistan
 Arbab Niaz Stadium
 Peshawar Club Ground
 Qayyum Stadium
 Abdul Wali Khan Sports Complex
 Mardan Sports Complex Pakistan
 Swat Sports Complex

References 

Buildings and structures in Peshawar
Stadiums in Pakistan
Cricket grounds in Pakistan
Sport in Peshawar
Sport in Khyber Pakhtunkhwa